DayZ or Dayz may refer to:

 DayZ (mod), a mod for the 2009 video game ARMA 2
 DayZ (video game), a standalone game derived from the aforementioned mod
 Dayz (Nissan), a rebadged version of the Mitsubishi eK car